The 2023 ACC Emerging Teams Asia Cup will be the fifth edition of the ACC Emerging Teams Asia Cup tentatively scheduled in July 2023

The 2023 ACC Emerging Teams Asia Cup was the fifth edition of the ACC Emerging Teams Asia Cup held in Nepal 
Eight teams in the tournament are A teams from India, Pakistan, Sri Lanka, Afghanistan, Bangladesh and 3 qualifiers from the 2023 ACC Men's Premier Cup.

Teams
The teams were placed in the following groups.

References

Cricket in Asia
Asian Cricket Council competitions